Zoya is a feminine Russian and Ukrainian first name, a variant of Zoe, meaning "life", from Greek ζωή (zoē), "life".

People
 Zoya (born 1993), American singer
 Zoya Afroz (born 1994), Indian actress and model
 Zoya Akhtar (born 1972), Indian film director and screenwriter
 Zoya Barantsevich (1896–1952), Russian actress 
  (born 1987), Russian actress on the TV series Fartsa
 Zoya Buryak (born 1966), Russian actress
 Zoya Cherkassky-Nnadi (born 1976), Israeli artist
 Zoya Douchine (born 1983), German figure skater
 Zoya Fyodorova (1909–1981), Russian actress
 Zoya Hussain (born 1990), Indian actress, writer and director
 Zoya Ivanova (born 1952), retired long-distance runner from Kazakhstan
 Zoya Kosmodemyanskaya (1923–1941), Soviet partisan, Hero of the Soviet Union
 Zoya Krakhmalnikova (1929–2008), Russian Christian writer, activist and Soviet dissident
 Zoya Klyuchko (1933–2016), Ukrainian entomologist
 Zoya Mironova (1913–2008), Russian speed skater and surgeon
 Zoya Nasir (born 1990), Pakistani television actress and beautician 
 Zoya Phan (born 1980), political activist for the Karen people of Burma currently living in the UK
 Zoya Pirzad (born 1952), renowned Iranian-Armenian writer and novelist
 Zoya Schleining (born 1961), German chess player
 Zoya Semenduyeva (1929–2020), Soviet and Israeli poet
 Zoya Smirnow, survivor of a corp of twelve Russian girls who disguised themselves as boys to join the army
 Zoya Spasovkhodskaya (born 1949), Soviet heptathlete
 Zoya Svetova (born 1959), Russian journalist and author
 Zoya Voskresenskaya (1907–1992), Soviet diplomat and author
  (born 1950), Persian-Armenian playwright, lyricist, and poet; see Iranian rock

Surname
 Shaalin Zoya (born 1997), Indian actress, dancer and anchor
  (born 1998), Canadian rapper and performer at the 2021 Osheaga Get Together

Fiction
 Zoya (film), a 1944 Soviet film
 Zoya (novel), a 1988 novel by Danielle Steel
 , a 1995 TV film based on the novel with Melissa Gilbert
 Zoya, a nurse and doctor in training in Aleksandr Solzhenitsyn's novel Cancer Ward
 Zoya Farooqui, a character on Qubool Hai, an Indian soap opera
 Zoya Lott, a character in Gossip Girl
 Zoya Nazyalensky, a character in Leigh Bardugo's Grishaverse novels; see King of Scars
 Zoya Qureshi, a character in Ishaqzaade, an Indian movie
 Zoya Siddiqui, the female protagonist of Bepannah, a soap opera airing on Colours TV
 Zoya Singh Solanki, the titular character of The Zoya Factor, an Indian movie
 Zoya the Destroya, alter ego of Ruth Wilder, a fictional wrestler in GLOW
 Zoya the Thief, a main character in Trine, a video game

Other uses
 Zöyä, the Tatar name of the village of Sviyazhsk
 1793 Zoya, an asteroid named after Zoya Kosmodemyanskaya

See also
 Zoe (name)
 Zoia

Slavic feminine given names
Russian feminine given names